Frank Cadogan Cowper  (16 October 1877 – 17 November 1958) was an English painter and illustrator of portraits, historical, and literary scenes, described as "The last of the Pre-Raphaelites".

Life and work

Cowper was born in Wicken, Northamptonshire, son of an author and early pioneer of coastal cruising in yachts, Frank Cowper, and grandson of the rector of Wicken.  He first studied art at St John's Wood Art School in 1896 and then went on to study at the Royal Academy Schools from 1897 to 1902. He first exhibited at the Royal Academy in 1899, and achieved critical success two years later with his An Aristocrat answering the Summons to Execution, Paris 1791 (1901). In 1902, he spent six months studying under Edwin Austin Abbey before travelling to Italy.

He worked in both watercolours and oils, and also worked as book illustrator – providing the illustrations for Sir Sidney Lee's The Imperial Shakespeare. He contributed to a mural in the Houses of Parliament in 1910 along with Byam Shaw, Ernest Board and Henry Arthur Payne.

As art fashion changed Cowper increasingly exhibited his portrait paintings but still continued to produce historical and literary works.

He retired from London to Gloucestershire. His The Ugly Duckling was voted the favourite painting by visitors to the Cheltenham Art Gallery & Museum in 2005.

The record price for a Cowper painting at sale is £469,250 for Our Lady of the Fruits of the Earth (1917) at Christie's in London on 17 December 2011.

Professional memberships
Royal Watercolour Society (Associate 1904, Full member 1911).
Royal Academy (Associate 1907, Full member 1934).
Society of Graphic Art (From the early days of the Society, in 1921)

See also
List of Pre-Raphaelite paintings

References

Further reading
Amanda B. Waterman. Frank Cadogan Cowper: the last Pre-Raphaelite (University of Washington, 2008).

External links
 
F. C. Cowper online (Artcyclopedia)
F. C Cowper biography and paintings (Art Renewal Centre Museum)
 Profile on Royal Academy of Arts Collections

19th-century English painters
English male painters
20th-century English painters
English watercolourists
English illustrators
Pre-Raphaelite painters
Royal Academicians
People from West Northamptonshire District
1877 births
1958 deaths
Pre-Raphaelite illustrators
20th-century English male artists
19th-century English male artists